Tineola atricoma is a species of fungus moth (family Tineidae, subfamily Tineinae). It is known from Antananarivo, Madagascar.

This species has a wingspan of 18 mm. Head black. Palpi dark fuscous. Antennae over l, pale greyish. Thorax light purplish grey, anterior margin black. Forewings elongate, costa gently arched, apex obtuse, termen very obliquely rounded; deep greyish purple, cilia pale grey. Hindwings purplish-bronzy grey; cilia light grey.

References

Related pages
List of moths of Madagascar#Tineidae

Tineinae
Moths described in 1931